Personal medicine is an activity that a person does to obtain wellness, rather than something a person takes (e.g., medication) for wellness.

In the psychiatric setting, personal medicine, or other self-initiated, non-pharmaceutical self-care activities, is used to decrease symptoms, avoid undesirable outcomes such as hospitalization, and improve mood, thoughts, behaviors, and the overall sense of well-being. The phrase "personal medicine" has also been used by the popular press to refer to personalized medicine.

Psychiatric care 

The self-care use of "personal medicine" was first introduced in early 2003 as a result of qualitative research conducted by Patricia E. Deegan through the University of Kansas School of Social Welfare. After interviewing individuals who were taking psychiatric medication as a part of their recovery process, Deegan found that:

Interference 

Interferences or conflicts between a person's personal medicine and their prescribed medications may result in non-adherence and/or a diminished quality of life. Personal medicine can be integrated with shared decision making within the psychopharmacology consultation to improve adherence.
Research by Deegan and Robert E. Drake observed that:

Software 

In 2006, Deegan expanded the concept of personal medicine into a software program called CommonGround for use in mental health clinics. Users of CommonGround are encouraged to develop their own unique personal medicines and are reminded of these personal medicines with subsequent use. The software also includes three-minute video vignettes of people talking about their recovery from mental illness and how they achieved it, i.e., gaining wellness via personal medicine.

See also 
 Personal genomics
 Self-care

References

Practice of medicine